Marple South and High Lane is an electoral ward in the Metropolitan Borough of Stockport. It elects three Councillors to Stockport Metropolitan Borough Council using the first past the post electoral method, electing one Councillor every year without election on the fourth.

It covers the southern part of Marple. Together with Bredbury & Woodley, Bredbury Green and Romiley, Hazel Grove, Marple North, and Offerton it constitutes the Hazel Grove Parliamentary constituency. Marple South and High Lane is also home to the Marple Sixth Form College, which is part of Cheadle and Marple Sixth Form College.

The ward was previously called Marple South but the council agreed to the ward's name change in October 2017 following a public consultation.

Councillors
Marple South and High Lane electoral ward is represented in Westminster by William Wragg MP for Hazel Grove.

The ward is represented on Stockport Council by three councillors: Colin Macalister (Lib Dem), Aron Thornley (Lib Dem)., and Shan Alexander (Lib Dem)

 indicates seat up for re-election.  indicates councillor defected.

Elections in the 2010s

May 2019 
Kenny Blair left the Conservatives and became an Independent councillor in 2018.

May 2018

May 2016

May 2015

May 2014

May 2012

May 2011

References

External links
Stockport Metropolitan Borough Council

Wards of the Metropolitan Borough of Stockport
Marple, Greater Manchester